The Behela (also: Luchin) is a right tributary of the river Bega in Romania. It discharges into the Bega in Timișoara.

References

Rivers of Romania
Rivers of Timiș County